Anacampsis humilis is a moth of the family Gelechiidae. It was described by Ronald W. Hodges in 1970. It is found in Brazil.

The larvae feed on the leaves of Trifolium repens.

References

Moths described in 1970
Anacampsis
Moths of South America